Leon Perry, Jr. (born August 14, 1957) is a former American football running back in the National Football League (NFL) and United States Football League (USFL). He played in the NFL for the New York Giants and in the USFL for the Birmingham Stallions and Orlando Renegades. He played college football at Mississippi.

References

1957 births
Living people
People from Gloster, Mississippi
Players of American football from Mississippi
American football running backs
Ole Miss Rebels football players
New York Giants players
Birmingham Stallions players
Washington Federals/Orlando Renegades players